Bayaraagiin Gerelt-Od is a ski-orienteering competitor from Mongolia. At the 2011 Asian Winter Games, he won a bronze medal in the sprint, behind Mikhail Sorokin and Alexandr Babenko, and a bronze medal in the long distance behind Sorokin and Alexey Nemtsev.

References

Year of birth missing (living people)
Living people
Mongolian male cross-country skiers
Mongolian orienteers
Male orienteers
Ski-orienteers
Asian Games medalists in ski orienteering
Ski-orienteers at the 2011 Asian Winter Games
Asian Games bronze medalists for Mongolia
Medalists at the 2011 Asian Winter Games